Cameron County High School is an institution of secondary education in Emporium, Pennsylvania, and is the only high school in the Cameron County School District of rural Cameron County, Pennsylvania. There are about 400 students in grades 7 to 12 attending the school.

Alma Mater
Red and White, we sing our praise to you 
and to our Alma Mater, we will e'er be true
We hail thee, oh High School fair and strong
We will always cherish thee, oh hear our song
So we will cheer, cheer, cheer, Alma Mater, Our ray of guiding light
We proudly sing, hail all hail, for the Red and the White

Graduation requirements
All students wishing to graduate from CCHS  must complete the following coursework in grades 9-12 in order to receive a diploma:
 English - 4 credits
 Social Studies - 4 credits
 Science - 4 credits
 Math - 4 credits
 Physical Education - one course each year
 Health - one course in Grade 7 and 11
 Complete a senior project

Athletics
CCHS participates in PIAA District IX.

Notable alumni

Nate Sestina (born 1997), basketball player in the Israeli Basketball Premier League

References

External links
 Great Schools page
 Facebook page

Public high schools in Pennsylvania
Schools in Cameron County, Pennsylvania
Public middle schools in Pennsylvania